Abdul Gafur, Abdul Gaffoor or similar may refer to:

 Abdul Gafur Hali (1929–2016), Bangladeshi folk lyricist, composer and singer
 Abdul Gafur (language activist) (born 1929), Bangladeshi journalist, teacher, writer and language activist
 Abdul Gafur Bhuiyan, Bangladeshi politician
  (1939–2020)

See also
 Masjid Abdul Gaffoor, a mosque in Little India, Singapore